West Handley is a hamlet in North East Derbyshire in the county of Derbyshire in England.

Location
West Handley lies just south of the village of Marsh Lane, south-west of Eckington, East of Middle Handley and around 3 miles south of the village of Ridgeway.

History
Although today the hamlet is nothing more than a group of large farm houses, the area was historically known for sickle smithing as well as farming.

References

External links
West Handley maps and photographs

Hamlets in Derbyshire
North East Derbyshire District